The knockout phase of UEFA Women's Euro 2017 began on 29 July 2017 and ended on 6 August 2017 with the final.

All times local (UTC+2).

Format
In the knockout stage, extra time and penalty shoot-out are used to decide the winner if necessary.

On 1 June 2017, the UEFA Executive Committee agreed that the competition would be part of the International Football Association Board (IFAB)'s trial to allow a fourth substitute to be made during extra time.

Qualified teams
The top two placed teams from each of the four groups, qualified for the knockout stage.

Bracket

Quarter-finals

Netherlands vs Sweden

Germany vs Denmark

Austria vs Spain

England vs France

Semi-finals

Denmark vs Austria

Netherlands vs England

Final

Notes

References

External links
Official website

Knockout stage